Qu Xiao-Song (瞿小松; surname Qu, b. Guiyang, Guizhou province, southwest China, September 6, 1952) is a Chinese composer of contemporary classical music.

He is a 1983 graduate of the Central Conservatory of Music in Beijing, where he studied composition with Du Mingxin.  In 1989 he was invited by the Center for US-China Arts Exchange of Columbia University in New York City to be a visiting scholar, and he continues to live in New York City.

He has received commissions from the Holland Festival, American Composers Forum, Hong Kong Chinese Orchestra, and Boston Musica Viva.  
His operas Oedipus and The Death of Oedipus were premiered in 1993 and 1994 respectively, in Stockholm and Amsterdam. His chamber opera The Test (2004) was commissioned by the Munich Biennale and Contemporary Opera Berlin, and performed in both cities in May 2004.

His name is sometimes also written Qu Xiaosong.

Music

Chamber music
Cello Concerto for cello and chamber ensemble
Cursive, violoncello and percussion ensemble
Ji No. 1, large mixed ensemble
Ji No. 2, Floating Clouds, mixed quartet, Asian instrument and ensemble
Ji No. 3: Silent Mountain, solo guitar or Asian instrument
Ji No. 4, percussion solo
Ji No. 5, Asian instrument and ensemble
Ji No. 6, percussion ensemble, large mixed ensemble
Ji No. 7, solo violin or violoncello
Lam Mot, percussion ensemble
String Symphony, string orchestra
The Girl of the Mountain, string solo and orchestra
Xi, percussion ensemble

Orchestral works
Cello Concerto for cello and full orchestra
Symphony No. 1HuanThe MountainVocal worksFang Yan Kou, low voice and ensembleMist, vocal soloists and ensembleMist 2, high voice and ensembleMist 3, high voice and ensembleMong Dong, low voice and ensembleWeisst du wie der Regen klingt.../Rain, mixed chorus and ensemble

OratorioCleaving the Coffin: Oratorio, mixed chorus, vocal soloists and ensemble

OperaLife on a StringOedipusThe Death of OedipusThe Test''

Trivia
Qu dated the Chinese actress Bai Ling in the mid-1990s.

References

External links
Peermusic Classical: Qu Xiao-Song page Composer's Publisher and Bio
Qu Xiao-Song biography
 

1952 births
Living people
20th-century classical composers
21st-century classical composers
People's Republic of China composers
Place of birth missing (living people)
People from Guiyang
Musicians from Guizhou
Chinese male classical composers
Chinese classical composers
20th-century male musicians
21st-century male musicians